Ig Henneman (born 21 December 1945) is a Dutch composer and bandleader. She was born in Haarlem, Netherlands, and took music lessons as a child. She studied viola and violin in Amsterdam and Tilburg, and composition with Robert Heppener.

After completing her studies, Henneman worked as a violist in orchestras, and then co-founded the rock band FC Gerania where she began to compose. In 1985 she founded the Ig Henneman Quintet. She also improvises on viola with Henneman Sextet, Duo Baars-Henneman with Ab Baars and the Queen Mab Trio.

Works
Henneman has composed for orchestras, ensembles and soloists, plus pieces for film and theater.
Baby Ryazanskye film soundtrack (1927) silent movie by Olga Preobrasjenskaja
Bow Valley Whistle for flute and samples
Kindred Spirits improvisational project

Her work has been recorded and issued on CD, including:
Ig Henneman Jaimie Branch Anne La Berge, Dropping Stuff and other Folk Songs (RPR 1094, Wig 29) 2019
Ig Henneman Sextet, Cut a Caper (Wig 19) 2010
Baars Henneman Mengelberg, Sliptong (Wig 16) 2009
Duo Baars-Henneman, Stof (Wig 13) 2006
Queen Mab Trio, Thin Air (Wig 14) 2006
Queen Mab Trio, See Saw (Wig 11) 2005

References

External links 
 Stichting Wig 

1945 births
Living people
20th-century classical composers
Dutch music educators
Dutch women classical composers
Dutch classical composers
People from Haarlem
Women music educators
20th-century women composers